Edward Marsh may refer to:

 Edward Marsh (cricketer) (1865–1926), British cricketer
 Edward Marsh (polymath) (1872–1953), British polymath, translator, arts patron and civil servant
 Edward Marsh (rower) (born 1874), American Olympic rower
 Edward Garrard Marsh (1783–1862), English poet and Anglican clergyman
 Eddie Marsh (bishop), Canadian bishop

See also
 Eddie Marsh (footballer) (1927–2010), Scottish footballer
 Edward Marsh Williams (1818–1909), British missionary
 Edwin Marsh (1899–1968), Australian rules footballer